Enolmis userai is a moth of the family Scythrididae. It was described by Ramón Agenjo Cecilia in 1962. It is found in Spain.

References

External links
Original description as Bryophaga userai: 

Scythrididae
Moths described in 1962